KGCR is a Christian radio station broadcasting on 107.7 FM, licensed to Goodland, Kansas, serving Northwestern Kansas. The station is owned by The Praise Network, Inc.

KGCR began broadcasting March 1, 1988. The station was donated to The Praise Network in 1998.

The station's format consists of Christian adult contemporary, along with Christian talk and teaching programs. Christian talk and teaching programs heard on KGCR include; Revive Our Hearts with Nancy Leigh DeMoss, Focus on the Family, Insight for Living with Chuck Swindoll, and Joni and Friends.

KGCR also broadcasts "Classic KGCR" on a digital sub-carrier, which plays traditional Christian hymns and lite southern gospel, along with Christian talk and teaching programs.

Translators
KGCR is also heard on KGCD in Wray, Colorado, as well as translators in Cheyenne Wells, Colorado, and McCook, Nebraska.

References

External links 
KGCR's official website

Contemporary Christian radio stations in the United States
Radio stations established in 1988
1988 establishments in Kansas
GCR